Burning Bridges is a 1928 American silent Western film featuring Harry Carey, directed by James P. Hogan and released through Pathe Exchange.

Cast
 Harry Carey as Jim Whitely / Bob Whitely
 Kathleen Collins as Ellen Wilkins
 William Bailey as Jim Black (as William N. Bailey)
 David Kirby as Crabs (as Dave Kirby)
 Raymond Wells as Slabs
 Eddie Phillips as Tommy Wilkins (as Edward Phillips)
 Florence Midgley as Widow Wilkins
 Henry A. Barrows as Ed Wilson
 Sam Allen as Dr. Zach McCarthy

References

External links
 

1928 films
1928 Western (genre) films
American black-and-white films
Films directed by James Patrick Hogan
Pathé Exchange films
Silent American Western (genre) films
1920s American films